Syed Muhammad Asghar Shah (born 10 November 1949) is a Pakistani  politician  who had been a member of the National Assembly of Pakistan, from 2002 to 2007 and again from June 2013 to May 2018.

Early life
He was born on 10 November 1949.

Political career

He was elected to the National Assembly of Pakistan as a candidate of Pakistan Muslim League (Q) (PML-Q) from Constituency NA-188 (Bahawalnagar-I) in 2002 Pakistani general election. He received 77,362 votes and defeated Muhammad Akram Wattoo, a candidate of Pakistan Peoples Party (PPP).

He ran for the seat of the National Assembly as an independent candidate from Constituency NA-188 (Bahawalnagar-I) in 2008 Pakistani general election but was unsuccessful. He received 40,191 votes and lost the seat to Khadim Hussain Wattoo.

He was re-elected to the National Assembly as an independent candidate from Constituency NA-188 (Bahawalnagar-I) in 2013 Pakistani general election. He received 90,537 votes and defeated Khadim Hussain Wattoo, a candidate of Pakistan Muslim League (N) (PML-N). He joined PML-N after getting elected to the National Assembly. In October 2017, he was appointed as Federal Parliamentary Secretary for Water Affairs.

In April 2018, reportedly he announced to quit PML-N. However, he rejected the claims.

He ran for the seat of the National Assembly as a candidate of Pakistan Tehreek-e-Insaf (PTI) from Constituency NA-166 (Bahawalnagar-I) in 2018 Pakistani general election but was unsuccessful.

References

Living people
Pakistan Muslim League (N) MNAs
Pakistan Muslim League (Q) MNAs
Pakistani MNAs 2013–2018
1949 births
Pakistani MNAs 2002–2007